PHT can stand for:

 Philippine Time
 Pulmonary hypertension
 Pseudo-Hadamard transform
 Prefix Hash Tree
 Polyhexahydrotriazine
 Postmenopausal hormone therapy
 Phenytoin